7 is a number, numeral, and glyph.

7 or seven may also refer to:
 AD 7, the seventh year of the AD era
 7 BC, the seventh year before the AD era
 The month of July

Music

Artists
 Seven (Swiss singer) (born 1978), a Swiss recording artist
 Seven (Korean singer) (born 1984), a South Korean recording artist
 Se7en (American singer) (born 1986), the former stage name of Sevyn Streeter
 Mick Thomson or #7, an American recording artist
 Seven (band), a British AOR band
 The Seven (band) a late 1960s rock band from Syracuse, New York 
 Seven (record producer) (born 1980), an American producer

Albums
 7 (Apoptygma Berzerk album), 1996
 7 (Beach House album), 2018
 7 (Big Wreck album), 2023
 7 (Bushido album), 2007
 7 (Con Funk Shun album), 1981
 7 (David Guetta album), 2018
 7 (David Meece album), 1985
 7 (Enrique Iglesias album), 2003
 7 (George Strait album), 1986
 7, an album by Kotiteollisuus, 2005
 7 (Lil Nas X EP), 2019
 7, an album by Los Pericos, 2005
 7 (Madness album), 1981
 7 (Michalis Hatzigiannis album), 2008
 7... (Mint Condition album), 2011
 7 (Nancy Ajram album), 2010
 7 (O.S.T.R. album), 2006
 7 (Platero y Tú album), 1997
 7 (S Club 7 album), 2000
 7 (Sanna Nielsen album), 2014
 7 (Seal album), 2015
 7 (Sixx:A.M. EP), 2011
 7 (Talisman album), 2006
 7 (U2 EP), 2002
 7 (Zap Mama album), 1997
 7: The Best of Stryper, 2003
 Seven (Bob Seger album), 1974
 Seven (Brooke Ligertwood album), 2022
 Seven (Enuff Z'nuff album), 1997
 Seven (James album), 1992
 Seven (Janno Gibbs album), 2004
 Seven (Lisa Stansfield album), 2014
 Seven (Mustafa Sandal album), 2003
 Seven (Night Ranger album), 1998
 Seven (Poco album), 1974
 Seven (Soft Machine album), 1973
 Seven (Suns of Arqa album), 1987
 Seven (Tony Banks album), 2004
 Seven (Winger album), 2023
 Seven (Wolfstone album), 1999
 Number 7 (Commissioned album), a 1991 album by Commissioned
 Number Seven (Phideaux Xavier album), 2009
 Number Seven (Will Hoge album), 2011
 Map of the Soul: 7, a 2020 album by BTS

Songs
 "7" (Catfish and the Bottlemen song), 2016
 "7" (Prince song), a 1992 song by Prince and the New Power Generation
 "7" (Shizuka Kudō song), 1995
 "Seven" (David Bowie song), 1999
 "Seven" (Fever Ray song), 2009
 "Seven" (Kōji Wada song), 1999
 "Seven" (Mika Nakashima song), 2004
 "Seven" (Sunny Day Real Estate song), 1994
 "Seven" (Taylor Swift song), 2020
 "Seven", a 1999 song by Karma to Burn from Wild, Wonderful Purgatory
 "Seven", a 1999 song by Megadeth from Risk
 "Seven", a 2003 song by This Day Forward from In Response
 "Seven", a 2007 song by Army of the Pharaohs from Ritual of Battle
 "Seven", a 2007 song by Symphony X from Paradise Lost
 "Seven", a 2007 song by Tijuana Sweetheart from Public Display of Infection
 "Seven", a 2008 song by They Might Be Giants from Here Come the 123s
 "Seven", a 2009 song by Dave Matthews Band from Big Whiskey & the GrooGrux King
 "Seven", a 2009 song by Tyler the Creator from the mixtape Bastard
 "Seven", a 2011 song by Erra from Impulse
 "Seven", a 2015 song by Phinehas from Till the End
 "7", a 1999 song by Moby from the album Play
 "The Seven", a 2017 song by Primus from The Desaturating Seven

Film and television

Films
 Seven (1979 film), action film directed by Andy Sidaris
 Seven (1995 film), thriller film directed by David Fincher, often stylized "Se7en"
 Seven (2019 Indian film), thriller film directed by Nizar Shafi
 Seven (2019 Nigerian film)

Television
 Seven Network or Channel Seven, an Australian free-to-air network
 Seven (UK TV channel), an independent local station in North and North East Lincolnshire, England
 Seven (TV series), an Indian television series
 @Seven, a New Zealand comedy and news show
 "The Seven" (Seinfeld), a 1996 episode of Seinfeld
 Seven, a character on Married... with Children
 Seven, a character in the film 9
 Sjuan, The Seven, a Swedish television channel
 The Seven, the Friday and Weekend Counterpart of BBC Scotland's The Nine

Other arts and media
 Seven (play), a 2008 documentary play based on the lives of seven women campaigners
 The Seven (play), a play by Will Power
 The Seven (A Song of Ice and Fire), fictional deity from A Song of Ice and Fire by George R. R. Martin
 7 (sculpture), a sculpture by Richard Serra, located in Doha, Qatar
 Seven (novel), a novel by Farzana Doctor
 Seven on 7, a 2021 promotional web series

Transportation

Automobiles
 Austin 7, a 1922–1939 British economy car
 BMW 7 Series, a 1977–present German full-size luxury sedan
 Chery Arrizo 7, a 2013–present Chinese mid-size sedan
 Chery Tiggo 7, a 2016–present Chinese compact SUV
 Haima 7, a 2010–2013 Chinese compact SUV
 Lotus Seven, 1957–1973 British sports car
 Caterham 7, a 1973–present British sports car based on the Lotus Seven
 Qoros 7, a 2020–present Chinese mid-size SUV
 Toyota 7, a 1970 racing car

Transportation lines
 7 (Los Angeles Railway), a line of the Los Angeles Railway from 1932 to 1956
 7 (New York City Subway service), a line of the New York City Subway

Watercraft
 USS Seven (SP-727), a United States Navy patrol boat in commission from 1917 to 1918

Technology

Cameras
 Konica Minolta Maxxum 7D, an A-mount digital SLR camera
 Minolta Dimage 7, a digital bridge camera
 Minolta Maxxum 7, an A-mount 35mm film camera
 Sony α7, an E-mount digital mirrorless camera

Software
 Windows 7, an operating system by Microsoft
 Seven: The Days Long Gone, a role-playing video game

Other uses
 7, a letter in Squamish language orthography, which is used to represent the glottal stop
 7, used to transcribe ḥāʾ / heth (ح) and ḫāʾ (خ) in the Arabic chat alphabet
 Seven (brand), an Indian clothing company
 No. 7 (brand), a range of cosmetics sold by the retailer Boots UK
 River Seven, a river in North Yorkshire, England
 Kevin Fertig, a wrestler who uses the names 'Seven' and 'Kevin Thorn'
 Dustin Rhodes or Seven, a professional wrestler
 Trent Seven, British wrestler
 7 Up, a soda beverage
 The international calling code for Russia and neighboring countries

See also

The character ⁊
7 and 7, a mixed cocktail drink
Seven of Nine, a character in Star Trek: Voyager, referred to as "Seven"
7-inch single (7-inch vinyl)
07 (disambiguation)
007 (disambiguation)
Sevens (disambiguation)
Channel 7 (disambiguation)
network seven (disambiguation), including 7 network
Seven Sisters (disambiguation)
Seven Wonders (disambiguation)
Seven Samurai (disambiguation)
Magnificent Seven (disambiguation) 
VII (disambiguation), the Roman numeral for 7
7 Up (disambiguation)
Severn (disambiguation)
 SVN, a British pop band featuring Aimie Atkinson and Jarnéia Richard-Noel from the cast of SIX